"Girl Tonite" is the first single from Twista's Atlantic album, The Day After. It features R&B singer Trey Songz. "Girl Tonite" peaked at number 14 on the Billboard Hot 100 and was certified gold by the RIAA on June 14, 2006. The song samples "Tonight" by Ready for the World.

Charts

Weekly charts

Year-end charts

Certifications

References

2005 singles
Twista songs
Trey Songz songs
Song recordings produced by Jim Jonsin
Songs written by Twista
Dirty rap songs
Contemporary R&B ballads
2005 songs